Burhan Eşer (born 1 January 1985) is a Turkish footballer who plays as a midfielder for TFF Second League club Isparta 32 Spor.

External links
 
 
 

1985 births
People from Diyarbakır
Living people
Turkish footballers
Turkey youth international footballers
Turkey under-21 international footballers
Turkey B international footballers
Association football midfielders
Diyarbakırspor footballers
Gaziantep F.K. footballers
Gençlerbirliği S.K. footballers
Eskişehirspor footballers
Mersin İdman Yurdu footballers
Sivasspor footballers
Büyükşehir Belediye Erzurumspor footballers
Ankaraspor footballers
Akhisarspor footballers
1461 Trabzon footballers
Süper Lig players
TFF First League players
TFF Second League players